War Memorial Fieldhouse is a 5,000-seat multi-purpose arena in Laramie, Wyoming. It opened in 1951 along with War Memorial Stadium. It currently hosts the school's wrestling and indoor track and field programs.

It was home to the University of Wyoming Cowboys basketball team from 1951 until 1982 when it was replaced by the Arena-Auditorium.   

Its highest attendance was 10,580 spectators in 1953 in a game against Brigham Young University.

References

External links
Arena information

Basketball venues in Wyoming
Buildings and structures in Laramie, Wyoming
College indoor track and field venues in the United States
College wrestling venues in the United States
Defunct college basketball venues in the United States
Indoor track and field venues in Wyoming
Sports venues completed in 1951
Wrestling venues in Wyoming
Wyoming Cowboys and Cowgirls basketball venues
Wyoming Cowboys and Cowgirls track and field
Wyoming Cowboys wrestling venues
1951 establishments in Wyoming